Nowtarki may refer to:
 Nowtarki-ye Gharibi
 Nowtarki-ye Mokhtari
 Nowtarki-ye Tahmasebi